This is a list of regions of Jamaica by Human Development Index as of 2023 with data for the year 2021.

References 

Jamaica
Human Development Index
Jamaica